Jonesboro School is a public primary, intermediate and highschool located in Jonesboro, Texas (USA) and classified as a 1A school by the UIL. It is part of the Jonesboro Independent School District located in Coryell County. In 2015, the school was rated "Improvement Required" by the Texas Education Agency.

Athletics
The Jonesboro Eagles compete in the following sports:

 Basketball
 Cross Country
 Six Man Football
 Golf
 Tennis
 Track & Field

References

External links
Jonesboro ISD

Public high schools in Texas
Education in Coryell County, Texas